Addressing environmental issues in the United States, the Rio Solare (Literal translation being "River of the Sun") is a Closed-Loop Society concept. It is located in the area where Arizona, Nevada, and California meet.  The project covers a 22-mile stretch of the Colorado River from Laughlin, Nevada in the north to Needles, California in the south. The project at this time includes 8 major installations along this route, each of which is a world's first demonstration of proven technologies that exist today.

History

Conception and Design
Rio Solare was the idea of entrepreneur Richard Brindisi who derived of the concept while driving through the mountains surrounding Bullhead City, Arizona in 2008.  The concept of Rio Solare is a self-sustained, closed loop community similar to other global projects such as Kacare in Saudi Arabia or Masdar in Abu Dhabi. Like Epcot Center at Disney World, this concept would be an expose of technologies showcasing imagination, creativity, and application.

The Installations
As of 2022, there are eight proposed installations in the Rio Solare project:

 Laughlin Solar Tower, a concentrated solar power facility.
 Laughlin Solar Field, a conventional solar farm.
 Maglev Hyperloop, a demonstration vactrain line starting from Needles.
 City of Rio Solare, a planned community and incubator for biofuel and solar energy technologies, with energy from both sources made freely available to residents for powering homes and vehicles.
 Sugarcane Ethanol Plant, a sugarcane-fed bio-ethanol plant.
 The "World's Largest Algae Farm", a algae fuel aquaculture facility.
 Renewable Energy Lab and School, an educational institution affiliated with the National Renewable Energy Laboratory.
 Emerald River Eco Park, a mixed indoor and outdoor park and recreation area

References 

Solar power in the United States